The 29th Waffen Grenadier Division of the SS (1st Italian) also Legione SS Italiana ( was an SS formation of Nazi Germany during World War II. It was originally created in the puppet Italian Social Republic in 1943 as the Italian Legion, later renamed to a brigade. The unit was upgraded to division status on 10 February 1945.

Background 
The Kingdom of Italy on 8 September 1943 signed an armistice with the Allies.  In response, the German Army and the Waffen-SS disarmed Italian troops unless they were fighting for the German cause. The new Italian Social Republic was founded on 23 September 1943 under dictator Benito Mussolini. On 2 October 1943, Heinrich Himmler and Gottlob Berger devised the Programm zur Aufstellung der italienischen Milizeinheiten durch die Waffen-SS ("Program for the deployment of Italian militia forces by the Waffen-SS") which was approved by Adolf Hitler and Benito Mussolini.

Operational history

In October 1943, 15,000 volunteers started training at Truppenübungsplatz Münsingen, but 9,000 of them were unsuitable and released for training in police units, the Black Brigades or for labor.

On 23 November 1943, 13 Miliz-Battalions pledged their loyalty before being moved to SS-Ausbildungsstab Italien. The unit was commanded by  SS-Obergruppenführer Karl Wolff and called Italienische SS-Freiwilligen-Legion, but soon renamed 1. Sturmbrigade Italienische Freiwilligen-Legion.

In April 1944, three battalions fought against Allied bridgeheads of Anzio and Nettuno with good results, for which Heinrich Himmler on 3 May 1944 allowed them to wear SS-Runes on black rather than red and be fully integrated into the Waffen SS. Members of the "Vendetta" under former Blackshirt Lieutenant-Colonel Degli Oddi particularly distinguished themselves in defeating a determined effort by the U.S. 3rd Infantry Division to overrun their positions and capturing a number of prisoners.

On 7 September 1944, it was renamed to Waffen-Grenadier-Brigade der SS (italienische Nr. 1) under Generalkommando Lombardia of Army Group C. By December 1944, the unit comprised 15,000 men. In the spring of 1945, the division under the command of Ernst Tzschoppe as Kampfgruppe Binz fought against French units in Lombardy and the Partisans in Piedmont. On 30 April 1945, the division surrendered to US troops in Gorgonzola, Lombardy.

Organization 
Structure of the division:

 Headquarters
 81st (1st Italian) SS Grenadier Regiment
 82nd (2nd Italian) SS Grenadier Regiment
 29th SS Fusiliers Battalion
 29th SS Engineer Company
 29th SS Artillery Regiment
 29th SS Tank Destroyer Battalion
 29th SS Signal Battalion
 29th SS Divisional Supply Group

Commanders 
March 1944 – September 1944: SS-Obergruppenführer Karl Wolff
September 1944 – September 1944: SS-Brigadeführer Pietro Mannelli
September 1944 – October 1944: SS-Brigadeführer Peter Hansen
October 1944 – November 1944: SS-Brigadeführer Gustav Lombard
November 1944 – February 1945: SS-Standartenführer Constantin Heldmann
February 1945 – April 1945: SS-Oberführer Erwin Tzschoppe

See also
 Waffen-SS foreign volunteers and conscripts
 Pio Filippani Ronconi
List of German divisions in World War II
List of Waffen-SS divisions
List of SS personnel

References

Footnotes

Bibliography
Stein, G (1966) The Waffen SS: Hitler's Elite Guard at War 1939-1945. Cornel Uni. Press, London.
Guerra, N (2020) The Italian SS-fascist ideology. An ideological portrait of the Italian volunteers in the Waffen-SS. A summary essay. Settentrione, Turku. 
Guerra, N (2012) I volontari italiani nelle Waffen-SS. Il pensiero politico, la formazione culturale e le motivazioni al volontariato. Una storia orale. Annales Universitatis Turkuensis, Turku. 
Guerra, N (2014) I volontari italiani nelle Waffen-SS. Pensiero politico, formazione culturale e motivazioni al volontariato. Solfanelli Editore, Chieti. 
Guerra, N (2013) "«La guerra è una brutta bestia e non andrebbe mai fatta, ci si trova sotto le bombe con la paura di morire e ci si trova in postazione per ammazzare». La guerra e la morte: il destino nell’esperienza dei volontari italiani nelle Waffen-SS",Chronica Mundi - Volume 6–8, 
Mitcham, Samuel W. German Order of Battle, volume 3: Panzer, Panzer Grenadier, and Waffen SS Divisions in World War II. Mechanicsburg, Pennsylvania: Stackpole Books, 2007. .

Foreign volunteer units of the Waffen-SS
Infantry divisions of the Waffen-SS
Security units of Nazi Germany disestablished in 1945
Security units of Nazi Germany established in 1943